Cebo Dlamini is a South African rugby union player for the  in the Currie Cup. His regular position is prop.

Dlamini was named in the  side for the 2022 Currie Cup Premier Division.

References

South African rugby union players
Living people
Rugby union props
Blue Bulls players
Year of birth missing (living people)
Griquas (rugby union) players